Guillermo Jorge Navarro Solares,  (born July 29, 1955) is a Mexican cinematographer and television director. He has worked in Hollywood since 1994 and is a frequent collaborator of Guillermo del Toro and Robert Rodriguez. In 2007, he won the Academy Award for Best Cinematography and the Goya Award for Best Cinematography for del Toro's  Pan's Labyrinth. His subsequent filmography runs the gamut from lower-budget arthouse and genre films to high-profile blockbusters like Hellboy, Zathura: A Space Adventure, Night at the Museum, and Pacific Rim.

Navarro's directing debut came with a 2012 music video for musician Mia Maestro titled "Blue Eyed Sailor", co-directed with media artist Juan Azulay, also featuring son Alvaro Navarro's cinematography. He has since directed episodes of series like Hannibal and Luke Cage, and was an executive producer on the National Geographic documentary series Hostile Planet, for which he earned his first Primetime Emmy nomination.

Early life and education 
Navarro was born Guillermo Jorge Navarro Solares in 1955 in Mexico City. He began taking still photographs at age 13 when took a photography workshop in middle school, and built his own darkroom. He worked for several years as a freelance photographer, working on everything from album covers to fashion photography. He attended the National Autonomous University of Mexico, where he graduated with a degree in Sociology.

Career 
Navarro began working in the film industry when his sister, a producer, hired him as on-set still and continuity photographer for one of her films. The experience triggered an interest in cinematography, and he began working as a camera assistant. Rather than working his way up through the Mexican film industry the traditional way, he instead moved to Paris where he became the apprentice of cinematographer Ricardo Aronovich. He worked for around 10 years before shooting his first feature.

Film 
Navarro quickly formed a partnership with filmmaker Guillermo del Toro, first by shooting commercials then later his directorial debut Cronos, which won the prestigious Golden Ariel. Navarro moved to the United States in 1994, where he shot several films for director Robert Rodriguez and worked with high-profile directors Renny Harlin and Quentin Tarantino. He returned to Mexico in 2001 to shoot del Toro's The Devil's Backbone.

Navarro's most acclaimed work to date came in 2006 when he shot del Toro's dark fantasy drama Pan's Labyrinth. Navarro and Del Toro had to work with a largely unfamiliar Spanish crew due to their usual crew's unavailability. Navarro shot the film using his personal Moviecam Compact and Arriflex 435 ES cameras and Zeiss Ultra Prime and Variable Prime lenses. He used three different Kodak film stocks: Vision2 200T 5217, Vision2 500T 5218, and Vision 250D 5246, depending on the lighting conditions under which a scene was filmed. Much of the film was shot using day for night, underexposing the film three or four F stops. He purposefully kept lighting effects that could only be attained with sunlight, which jarred the image when it passed itself as night, creating an aura of experimentation. Because of the awkwardly-shaped spaces of the fantasy sets, Navarro had to be creative with his lighting, finding places to put his lamps that also didn't disrupt the image. A lot of light was strictly attained by bouncing it into the set. For certain scenes, the crew also drilled tiny holes into the walls of the set and placed little lights into the spaces.

Navarro's work earned him an Academy Award, a Goya Award, an Ariel Award, and Independent Spirit Award for Best Cinematography.

Television 
Navarro began directing in 2013 with an episode of Hannibal. He has subsequently directed episodes for shows like The Bridge, Narcos, Preacher, and Luke Cage. He also shot the pilot episode of Star Trek: Discovery, directed by David Semel.

In 2019, Navarro made his producing debut as an executive producer on the National Geographic documentary series Hostile Planet. The series was nominated for a Primetime Emmy Award for Outstanding Documentary or Nonfiction Series.

Style 
His work often features very vivid blues and yellows which often take up most of the image, and the film's grain structure often switches between well-defined and sharp, and somewhat smoothed over or very fine.

Filmography

Film

Short films

Television 
Cinematographer

Director

Executive producer

Music videos 
Director

Cinematographer

References

External links
 
 Internet Encyclopedia of Cinematographers

1955 births
Best Cinematographer Academy Award winners
Independent Spirit Award winners
Living people
Mexican cinematographers
People from Mexico City
Mexican television directors